Cynaeda togoalis is a moth in the family Crambidae. It was described by Ferdinand Karsch in 1900. It is found in Togo.

References

Moths described in 1900
Odontiini